Jesse Marchant, better known by his stage name JBM, is a Canadian singer-songwriter. In 2011, he signed a recording contract with American label Partisan Records.

Early life and education
Marchant was born in Montreal, Quebec. He was classically trained in guitar from the age of seven. As a young man, Marchant lived in his family's home in the American Adirondack Mountains for three years, living mostly in seclusion, to realize songs that he had written earlier in Los Angeles, California. In 2008, he recorded songs in a church studio in Hudson, New York.

Career 
Marchant has toured with Nathaniel Rateliff, Rogue Wave, Avi Buffalo and Sondre Lerche. He has also performed with St. Vincent, Elvis Perkins, and Swedish singer The Tallest Man on Earth. His musical style has been compared to that of Jim James, Justin Vernon, Nick Drake, Neil Young and M. Ward.

Reception
Music critic Nick Gunther described JBM's music as instilling a "unique depth of emotion and feeling." Brittney McKenna in American Songwriter magazine wrote that there was a "level of peace and of stillness unique to a church" in Marchant's debut album and that his music "feels like one man's soft, musical prayer for hope in a world that too often has too little," and she compared his style to Thom Yorke and Neil Young. JBM's song "Ambitions & War" was described as a "honey-of-a-song" in Future Sounds magazine, with lyrics about a person who is losing their mind in Los Angeles.

Clubdistrict.com described the album as "exquisitely crafted" which feels "as weathered and wise as an old home" and which is a "mostly acoustic venture" with "atmospheric arrangements, lyrical purity and unaffected baritone." Mikela Floyd in Filter magazine described the debut album as "heartfelt compositions" reflecting "a meticulous and carefully crafted sound" from a "handcrafted talent." Steven Mansmith in Slowcoustic described the album as "a fantastic album" of 2010 and noted that the video by Brody Baker accompanying JBM's song Not Even in July, with "images of strewn lawn chairs, sunsets and searching through a dark forest" was a "great video for a great song."

Personal life 
, he lived in Brooklyn, New York; Los Angeles; and Upstate New York.

Discography
Antelope Running, 2021
Illusion of Love, 2018
Jesse Marchant, 2014
Stray Ashes, 2012
 Not Even in July, 2010, Partisan Records
 Not Even in July, 2008, vinyl format

Awards
 Top singer-songwriter 2009, iTunes

See also

 List of Canadian composers
 List of Canadian writers
 List of folk rock artists
 List of guitarists
 List of musicians from Quebec
 List of Partisan Records artists
 List of people from Los Angeles
 List of people from Montreal
 List of people from Brooklyn, New York
 List of singer-songwriters
 Music of Los Angeles
 Music of Montreal
 Music of New York City

References

External links
 , his official website
 
 JBM on Partisan Records website

Year of birth missing (living people)
20th-century births
20th-century American composers
20th-century Canadian male singers
20th-century Canadian writers
21st-century American composers
21st-century Canadian writers
Acoustic guitarists
Canadian expatriate musicians in the United States
Canadian expatriate writers in the United States
Canadian folk guitarists
Canadian male guitarists
Canadian folk rock musicians
Canadian pop guitarists
Canadian rock guitarists
Canadian singer-songwriters
Living people
Musicians from Brooklyn
People from Franklin County, New York
Pop rock singers
Rock songwriters
Singers from Montreal
Singers from New York City
Singers from Los Angeles
Songwriters from California
Songwriters from New York (state)
Songwriters from Quebec
Writers from Los Angeles
Writers from Montreal
Writers from Brooklyn
20th-century American guitarists
21st-century American guitarists
Guitarists from Los Angeles
Guitarists from New York City
American male guitarists
21st-century Canadian male singers
Western Vinyl artists
Canadian male singer-songwriters
American male songwriters